Odontorrhynchus is a genus of orchids (family Orchidaceae) belonging to the subfamily Orchidoideae. It constrains 6 known species, all native to the southern half of South America.

Odontorrhynchus alticola Garay - Peru, Argentina
Odontorrhynchus castillonii (Hauman) M.N.Correa  - Bolivia, Argentina
Odontorrhynchus domeykoanus Szlach. - Chile
Odontorrhynchus erosus Szlach. - Chile
Odontorrhynchus monstrosus Szlach. - Bolivia
Odontorrhynchus variabilis Garay - Chile

References 

  (1953) Darwiniana 10(2): 157.

External links 
 
 

Cranichideae genera
Spiranthinae
Orchids of South America